Francis Nhema (born 17 April 1959) is a Zimbabwean politician, who served as Minister of Youth Development, Indigenisation and Empowerment from 2013 to 2014.

History and biography
He previously was Minister of the Environment and Tourism. He is MP of the Shurugwi District. He was educated at Strathclyde University in Scotland.

He benefited from the seizure of land from white farmers, taking over a 10 km² farm, Nyamanda, in the Karoi district about 200 km north of Harare, from farmer Chris Shepherd.

During his tenure as Minister for the Environment, national parks have suffered greatly from poaching.

He was elected on 11 May 2007 to head the United Nations Commission on Sustainable Development.

When the ZANU–PF–Movement for Democratic Change national unity government was sworn in on 13 February 2009, Nhema was included in the Cabinet as Minister of the Environment.

He was put on the United States sanctions list in 2003.

References

1959 births
Living people
Government ministers of Zimbabwe
Alumni of the University of Strathclyde
ZANU–PF politicians
Members of the National Assembly of Zimbabwe